Are Avaaj Konacha (Marathi: अरे आवाज कोणाचा) is a 2013 Marathi movie directed by Hemant Deodhar. The film will emphasize on the life of karyakarta, their problems, the challenges they face during addressing the problems of society, political pressures.

Plot
Are Avaaj Konacha .... ?, a slogan best known and said during many political campaigns by several opinion leaders. For years together this slogan has brought everyone together.... One inner voice ...one slogan ....'Are avaaj konacha......?'

With change in time and high exposure the charm of our own ideologies of togetherness is lost. But even in such a lifestyle, there are few people in this society who have kept themselves rooted with utmost sincerity, with no selfish motives and with absolute urge to eradicate anti social elements from the society and support everyone for their well-being, these set of people are called KARYAKARTA (Social Worker), people who take an effort to solve the unanswered problems of the common man.

Cast
 Dr. Amol Kolhe As Uday Sawant
 Uday Tikekar As Annasaheb 
 Tushar Dalvi As Nanasaheb
 Aishwarya Narkar As Uday's Mother (Aai)
 Vishakha Subhedar As Tai 
 Manoj Joshi As Commissioner 
 Atharva Karve As Child Uday Sawant
 Vidyadhar Joshi As Advocate Bhosale
 Yashodhan Bal As Mr Ganu

Soundtrack

References

2013 films
2010s Marathi-language films